Sir Thomas Mark Horner, PC (born 1956) is a Northern Irish barrister and judge. He has been a Lord Justice of Appeal for Northern Ireland since 2022.

Horner was called to the Northern Irish bar in 1979 and became a Queen's Counsel in 1996. He was appointed to the High Court of Northern Ireland in 2012, receiving the customary knighthood.

He was sworn of the Privy Council in 2022.

References 

Knights Bachelor
Members of the Privy Council of the United Kingdom
Lords Justice of Appeal of Northern Ireland
High Court judges of Northern Ireland
Northern Ireland King's Counsel
1956 births
Living people